Robert Taussat (24 June 1920  31 December 2016) was a French local historian, biographer and novelist. He was the author of fifteen books, and the recipient of the 1993 Prix Eugène Carrière from the Académie française. He was the president of the Société des lettres, sciences et arts de l'Aveyron for two decades and the subject of a 2014 documentary about his life.

Early life
Robert Taussat was born on 24 June 1920 in Talence, Gironde, France. His family was from Montfaucon, Lot.

Career
Taussat began his career as a history teacher in Confolens. He subsequently worked for the Caisse d'allocations familiales for three decades. He was also a columnist for Midi Libre.
Taussat was the author of fifteen books, including works of local history about Aveyron. He also wrote several biographies and novels. For example, he wrote a biography of Jean Moulin. He won the Prix Eugène Carrière from the Académie française for Sept siècles autour de la cathédrale de Rodez in 1993.

Taussat served as the president of the Société des lettres, sciences et arts de l'Aveyron from 1984 to 2004. He donated an 1843 liturgical calendar which belonged to Don Joallis Francisci de Saunhac de Belcastel to the Château de Belcastel in 2013. He also served as the honorary president of the Société Jules-Verne. In 2015, he was appointed as the president of the National Order of Merit for Aveyron.

Taussat was the subject of a 2014 documentary directed by Tristan Francia; it premiered at the Musée Fenaille in Rodez. Two years later, he was interviewed for Paroles de Ruthénois, a documentary about Rodez for the 2016 European Heritage Days.

Death
Taussat died on 31 December 2016, aged 96. His funeral was held at the Rodez Cathedral on 3 January 2017.

Selected works

References

1920 births
2016 deaths
People from Talence
French local historians
French columnists
20th-century French historians
French male novelists
20th-century French novelists
French biographers
Recipients of the Ordre national du Mérite
20th-century French male writers
French male non-fiction writers
Male biographers